Buttala Divisional Secretariat is a  Divisional Secretariat  of Moneragala District, of Uva Province, Sri Lanka.

History
Buttala has been introduced as a special land area which belonged to the Ruhana Kingdom.  It was an important destination of the route of the King Dutugemunu, who marched towards the northern region after organizing the army for the battle with King Elara.

Landmarks
The Mligavia region is a historically important region located in the Buttala Divisional Secretaiate.  The region contains a re-erection of the 34-foot Buddha statue, which was built by King Aggabodi, a famous ruler of Ruhana.  It has been subjected to the high respects of thousands of Buddhists and Sri Lankans alike.  This statue is built out of rocks and doesn't require any support to stand.

References

 Divisional Secretariats Portal

Divisional Secretariats of Moneragala District